Murli may refer to:

 Murli, Bihar
 Murli (instrument)
MuRli, Togolese-Irish rapper